Bernard Gruener (born 9 May 1949) is a French former swimmer. He competed in the men's 100 metre freestyle at the 1968 Summer Olympics.

References

External links
 

1949 births
Living people
Olympic swimmers of France
Swimmers at the 1968 Summer Olympics
Sportspeople from Casablanca
French male freestyle swimmers